is a 49-volume Japanese light novel series written by Mizuna Kuwabara, published under Shueisha's Cobalt label. It was partially adapted into a 13-episode anime television series directed by Susumu Kudo in 2002 and an OVA directed by Fumie Muroi in 2004. Both were animated by Madhouse and produced by SME Visual Works (now Aniplex). The anime television series and the OVAs have since been released in North America by Media Blasters, and both have aired on Encore Action and Encore WAM.

Three gaiden (or side-story) prequels have been made: Honō no Mirage: Kaikou-Hen set in Sengoku period which consisted of 14 volumes (1999-2013), Honō no Mirage: Bakumatsu-Hen set in Edo period and had a total of 2 volumes (2009-2013), and Honō no Mirage: Shouwa-Hen set in Shouwa period with a total of 11 volumes (2014–2017).

The Shouwa-Hen gaiden was adapted into a five-part stage play produced by Trifle Entertainment. The first part was held at Theater Sun Mall in Shinjuku on September 17 to 23, 2014. The second part was held at Theater 1010 in Kita-Senju on October 8 to 13, 2015. The third part was held at Theater Sun Mall in Shinjuku on October 21 to 30, 2016. The fourth part was held at Theater 1010 in Kita-Senju on October 12 to 17, 2017. The fifth and final part was held at Space Zero Renrouzumi Hall in Shinjuku on August 11 to 19, 2018. A DVD (and Blu-Ray as of part four) was released a few months after each part was completed.

Plot
Takaya Ougi, a high school student, wants nothing more than to protect his best friend Yuzuru Narita and live a normal life. That is, until Nobutsuna Naoe, an intense and charismatic man, informs Takaya that he is in fact the reincarnation of Lord Kagetora, the adopted son of a noble samurai lord, Kenshin Uesugi. Naoe, himself a "possessor," or a soul reborn through time, reawakens Takaya's abilities to exorcise evil spirits and fight the Feudal Underworld,  a collection of restless warrior spirits bent on modern-day conquest. While most possessors remember their former lives before being reincarnated, Takaya is one of the few who doesn't, and is often hostile towards any effort for the complete recovery of his memory. As the plot unfolds, the complex history of the characters and their past suggests why this is so, and the true nature of the tempestuous and somewhat ambiguous relationship between the two leads provides the backdrop for a melodrama that spans several generations of Japanese history. As they ascend to the living world to renew their ancient war, Naoe, Takaya, and two other possessors gear up to prevent that from happening. The series is set in Matsumoto, a large city in Nagano.

OVA
The OVA Rebels of the River Edge (2003) has animated the book with same title. The OVA resumes the plot of the anime television series, yet incorporates several new developments, among them the question of unswerving loyalty and personal honor.  Takaya is sent to Kyoto to investigate the re-awakening of the Ikko sect and Murashige Araki, a one time member of the Ikkō sect who has since deserted the clan. With the help of his vassal and fellow possessor Haruie, the two are successful in tracking him down, only to discover that Murashige is after a 400-year-old mandala (a Buddhist ritualistic artifact and meditative aid) made of the hair of the deceased Araki clansmen. Unfortunately, by the time they meet up with Murashige, Haruie recognizes him as Shintarou, her former lover in a past life. Whether it's true or not, and despite the confusing emotional complication of this development, Takaya orders Haruie to eliminate Murashige once he becomes a true threat to the balance of power. Meanwhile, Takaya finally reunites with Naoe after a prolonged period of estrangement. Unresolved sexual and psychological tension dominates their initial exchange, and it's uncertain whether these two powerful possessors will resolve their differences and work together against this latest threat.

Characters

A lonely 17-year-old high school delinquent from Jyohoku High School who finds out that he's actually the reincarnation of Kagetora Uesugi, despite having repressed the memories of his prior existence due to a traumatic incident. When he was a junior high-school student, he was a famous juvenile delinquent at Matsumoto since he rebelled against his alcoholic father. Abrupt and outspoken in demeanor, he defiantly and exhaustingly denies the fact that he is Kagetora, refusing to believe that he is anyone but Takaya. He nonetheless exhibits a highly moral attitude towards his newfound duty as a "possessor" once he accepts the reality of his past. Through the course of the series, he develops a minor split personality, confusing his ancient persona with his current persona (i.e. Takaya Ohgi vs. Kagetora Uesugi). All of the Uesugi possessors, as well as close friends, call him "Takaya" unless he's in his Kagetora persona, save Naoe who always calls him "Lord Kagetora" as a mark of their master/vassal relationship. He's a very powerful magic user, capable of exorcising spirits and demons and constructing an energy barrier against attack.  He has a strong conviction and is stubborn, though he hides his vulnerably delicate mind with a bluff. Although he has serious misanthropy, he's incredibly defenseless and innocent toward man who he trusted. He's eager for a father figure and mentor, and tends to trust an older man. Takaya begins to trust and love Naoe due to his protection despite himself, and although he knows he may just be a substitute for Kagetora. Takaya becomes a wise, noble and charismatic leader after he regains Kagetora's memories, but it also begins a deep discord with Naoe due to an event 30 years in the past. Takaya becomes intent on "winning" or keeping the upper hand against Naoe although there is a strange attraction between them. However, due to the fact Takaya (as Kagetora) was raped by his foster lord's vassals when he was in Hojo clan, he hates sexual intercourse. At the end of the novel's part 1 "Youkihi the Sea Goddess", the situation has changed after Naoe's soul was damaged and can no longer use any power, including the ability to possess a new host. Takaya is disturbed by the idea that Naoe's death could be permanent, and his spirit be lost forever. Then he shows intense affection for Naoe, unleashing a powerful display of protective magic due to his fury that the Mori clan had taken Naoe hostage. In the end, Naoe protects him and died causing Takaya to lose his sanity however. However, when he seals his feelings on the advice of his real father, Ujiyasu Hojo's soul, he is able to beat his enemies. Then, he believed Kotaro is Naoe since he wakes up.

, 
The current incarnation of Nobutsuna Naoe. He is the third son of the Tachibana family and is a monk of Shingon-shu Buzan-ha at the Kougenji temple in Utsunomiya. He always wears a black suit with a black tie as Japanese mourning dress by reason of the sympathy for the dead person; he is also shown to occasionally smoke cigarettes whenever he's not working.  He owns three different cars-(one in dark green, one in white, and one in black). He is approximately eleven years older than Takaya-(making him around 28 years old), and much more methodical and deliberate in his methods. Intense and understated in speech, he nonetheless harbors a passionate and rebellious nature beneath his veneer of docility and allegiance. He and his family are known to be quite wealthy, partially because his older brother manages a real estate company. Naoe wields a similar form of energy magic and is capable of sensing demonic or supernatural auras. He can also make others possess a person's bodies compulsorily. Takaya and all other members of the Uesugi clan call him "Naoe". He was a subordinate of Kagekatsu Uesugi who killed Kagetora. However, he has become a servant of Kagetora by command of Kenshin Uesugi 400 years ago. Initially, he and Kagetora hated one another. He has since come to love Kagetora deeply-(even to the point where he harbors a romantic/sexual attraction to him), although he has jealousy and an inferiority complex towards "genius" Kagetora. He showed on several occasions that he would do anything to make him. He's deeply attached to the relationship between "winner" and "loser", and wishes to win against Kagetora who he perceives the "winner". In his previous life, he raped and impregnated Minako Kitazato, Kagetora's fiancé. Moreover, he forced Kagetora's spirit to possess Minako's body. Kagetora's body was killed in the fight against Oda who was eventually killed as well. Naoe regretted this misdeed and has become suicidal since Kagetora's next reincarnation was not found. Naoe behaves like a guardian and mentor to Takaya/Lord Kagetora, but he is afraid of losing Takaya's trust when the other regains his memories. However, he cannot control his suppressed desires - love, hate, and agony- and he almost rapes Takaya who regains his memories in shock. At the end of the novel's part 1 "Youkihi the Sea Goddess", his soul has suffered damage because he used his supernatural powers without rest while he was emotionally unstable. Naoe then lost his powers and his eyesight for a short time. He is held hostage by the Mori clan and he was suggested that he join to the Mori clan by Motoharu Kikkawa who felt pity for him. He confessed he wanted to be killed by Takaya while surrounded by flames, but he was persuaded by Takaya and reconciled with him. However, he protects Takaya from a bullet which Terumoto Mori fired. His eyes met those of Takaya and he dies.  In the book: part 2, it's revealed that he was saved by Kenshin, and he manipulated body of Makoto Kaizaki, descendant of the Satomi clan, by his mortally wounded body, uses spirit synchronization. In both the manga and anime series-(including the OVA) it's strongly implied that Naoe is bisexual.

The current incarnation of Nagahide Yasuda, two years older than Takaya, and on the surface a typical high school student. He is a possessor and magic user, but apparently also has the ability to alter the perceptions and memories of others.  He use items called Koppa-jin. His combat ability is most strong after Kagetora, he regarded Kagetora as his rival, not his vassal. All the Uesugi clan possessors call him by his ancient name "Nagahide", save Takaya who calls him by his current name, "Chiaki". His arrival in the series is accompanied by his sudden and mysterious appearance in Takaya's homeroom as his "best friend."  His loyalty to the Uesugi clan is at first questionable, since his whereabouts and intentions were unknown before his abrupt arrival in Takaya's life. He has a laid back personality and is slow to anger, and is concentrated and precise in combat. He's also considerate person, and he doesn't hesitate about help to help the weak and friend although he don't want to acknowledge it. Like Naoe, he belonged to the faction of Kagekatsu Uesugi when he was alive. Unlike other Uesugi clan that possession to fetus as possible, he possessed to a handsome young man because he hated his ancient ugly-looking. Though he says that he abandoned "Ultimate Bakappuru", he makes every effort to do help them at the risk of his life.

The current incarnation of Haruie Kakizaki, originally male. Somewhere in her past, whether by accident or design, she switched gender. She is a female college student about 21 years of age who rides a Yamaha FZR400 motorcycle called "Ecchan". Despite her decidedly feminine appearance, everyone calls her by "Haruie". She save Takaya who calls her by her current name "Ayako-neesan". She is easy going and friendly with a bit of a competitive streak. When she first meets Takaya, she challenges him to a motorcycle race and beats him easily. She is a powerful exorcist and dependable in combat, and has great magic power to identify a soul. She worshiped Kagetora since she/he was alive. Haruie formerly hated Naoe who was Kagetora's enemy and has assassinated himself at 400 years ago; first possession, but they trust each other now. She quarrels with Chiaki well but she gets along well with him, and they are perfect pair when they make fun of Naoe in particular. In the OVA series, Rebels of the River Edge (2003), her past experiences are developed in greater detail. 200 years ago, Haruie fall in love with young doctor Shintaro Sone when she was reborn in female form. However, Shintaro's died. She has been waiting for his reincarnation after what is to believe his promise. She is also the former lover of Araki before his death many years ago.

,  (Tokimeki Telephone)
The best friend of Takaya. He's always calm and good student, he's keeping an open mind and is tends to say poignant. He showed a strong psychic power sometimes. Yuzuru gets to know Takaya when he intended to kill his alcoholic father, he understood the mind of Takaya and supported him. Kosaka foretold he is "the menace of six realms". It's revealed Yuzuru is the reincarnation of Maitreya, and also Kagekatsu Uesugi.

,  (2nd Drama CD),  (Tokimeki Telephone)
The current name is Kimihiko Arai, who is college student. Shingen Takeda's mistress, and he belongs to Takeda clan. He's familiar with the circumstances of the Uesugi clan for some reason, then he makes fun of Naoe and enjoys it. He shows loyalty to Takeda clan, but he seems to have another purpose. He is elusive, always sarcastic, a proud person. He has legendary yōkai Nue that's good at data collection to his subordinates. He repeats possession like the Uesugi clan, has also great magic power to identify a soul. Despite his masculine physique, he is shown to have dark shoulder length hair that is usually kept down and even wears lipstick.

The real third brother of Kagetora. He calls Kagetora by Kagetora's former name, "Saburō". He care about Kagetora who sent in hostage to Uesugi clan, and want to take back him. He enter the war on Yami-Sengoku with his elder brother, Ujimasa Hojo. He suggested to Takaya that he's back in Hojo clan.

The Fūma ninja serving to Hojo clan. He is faithful to an order, is always expressionless and has no emotion like a robot. At the book: part 2, he pretends to be Naoe as Takaya wishes it though he plays awkwardly him.

The oldest member of the Uesugi clan. He appears after Part 2 in the book; because he possessed to a baby at Part 1. He has loyalty to Kenshin Uesugi and is calm, judicious person. In "Kaikou-hen" that the pre-sequel set in Japan 400 years ago, he exorcised the evil spirit of Kagetora that cursed his violent death, then he welcomed Kagetora who's guided by the soul of Kenshin. he has trouble with the arbitration of the Uesugi clan that hated each other, because members except for him made war against each other since they divided into the Kagetora vs. Kagekatsu factions before they died.

Yuzuru's junior in his club activities. He is half Japanese and half white. It's revealed he is the current incarnation of Ranmaru Mori, Nobunaga Oda's lover.

Uesugi clan's biggest enemy. The possessed of Eiji Shiba, known as the leader of the popular rock band "SEEVA" at later. He wants to take over the world by "Yami-Sengoku". He uses magic power to destroy the souls, also can makes the miraculous stone that make a man into his own slave. He killed Kagetora and Naoe in the battle 30 years ago.

The classmate of Takaya. She has crush on Yuzuru. She is an active, brisk and self-assured person.　

,  (Drama CD and Tokimeki Telephone)
The sister of Takaya. An innocent, mollycoddle, sweet girl. Takaya never wants to make her have a dangerous experience.

 (Tokimeki Telephone)
The eldest brother of Yoshiaki Tachibana. He runs the real estate company without inheriting the Kougenji temple, and he drives Yoshiaki hard as his secretary and his driver. He and his family worries about terribly nihilistic Yoshiaki that wanted to die since when he was young.

The fiance of Kagetora 30 years ago. She is related to an event that's attribution of discord between Kagetora and Naoe. She also appears in the pre-sequel, "Showa-hen".

The chairman of Hazama Confectionary.

The lost lover of Haruie who was said to have died many years ago-(however this is revealed to be a lie). He is also a member of the Ikko sect who deserted the clan long ago. With the help of his vassal Haruie, Takaya is finally successful in tracing him down who hunts down a 400-years-old mandala (a Buddhist artifact made for meditating) that was made out of the hair of the deceased Araki clansmen.

A client of Shigeharu and an old friend of Naoe's from college who offered him the mysterious mandala. His real last name is revealed to be Shimozuna-(シモズマ). It is said that many members of his clan had mysteriously vanished which caused him to "sense something very suspicious".

The right-hand man of Lord Kojiro's father.

Anime Episode list

  - Two high school friends discover they are the reincarnation of ancient warriors who soon realize they are locked in a deadly battle with the spirit of a long-dead evil warlord.
  - Naoe talks with Takaya about his past, the battle 400 years ago, and the awakening of Takeda Shinken.
  - Yuzuru goes missing after the binding bracelet Naoe gives him is removed.
  - Takaya meets a strange woman while riding his motorcycle to school. Afterwards he learns he has a new classmate and best friend he has no memory of. Later Uesugi meets Takaya at his school and senses an ominous presence.
  - Spirits from Japan's Dark Ages, known as Possessors, are reappearing in modern times. Takaya has now met two others with spirit powers, Naoe and Ayoho. They insist his body is being possessed by a powerful samurai.
  - Takaya's doubt meets its final test as his entire school turns into a spawning ground for the armies of the Undead.
  - For the past 2 months, Takaya and Naoe have been exorcising spirits left and right. For another lovely history lesson, Naoe takes Takaya to a special place where a war rages on.
  - Takaya is forced to confront his anger and mixed emotions about himself and Naoe. He must come to grips with these emotions quickly before he injures himself or someone else maliciously.
  - Naoe searches for and confronts the evil beast Tsutsuga.
  - Unable to accept his alternate identity, Takaya meets with Ujiteru Hojo, Kagetora's brother, and he is forced to remember his past with Naoe.
  - The Hojo clan begins a cataclysmic plan to take over Nikko. They've kidnapped Yuzuru and plan to burn him alive to release a burst of spiritual energy.
  - An unexpected answer is given to Lord Ujiasu's proposal.
  - Naoe and Takaya search for the Tsutsuga mirrors to destroy them.

OVA episode list

Novel Volumes List

Original Series
 
  #2
  #3
  #4
  #5
  #6
  #7
  #8
  #9
  #10
  #11
  #12
  #13
  #14
  #15
  #16
  #17
  #18
  #19
  #20
  #20.5
  #21
  #22
  #23
  #24
  #25
  #26
  #27
  #28
  #29
  #30
  #31
  #32
  #33
  #34
  #35
  #36
  #37
  #38
  #39
  #40
Extras

Kaikou-Hen Series
  #1
  #2
  #3
  #4
  #5
  #6
  #7
  #8
  #9
  #10
  #11
  #12

Bakumatsu-Hen Series
  #1
  #2

Shouwa-Hen Series
  #1
  #2
  #3
  #4
  #5
  Side Story
  #6
  #7
  #8
  #9
  #10

Drama CD
  , 1992
  , 1993
  , 1994
  , 1997

The main voice actors in the drama CD series and the anime series (Japanese ver) are same. Besides, "Cobalt Tokimeki Telephone(コバルトときめきテレフォン)" that short stories or drama CDs which Seki Toshihiko and Sho Hayami reading the novels are made for premiums by Cobalt's all the applicants service.

Image Album and Anime OST
Mai Yamane (as Kathy Shower), Naoto Fuuga also sang image songs in the albums.

Image Album
  , 1993
   (Karaoke ver of 1st Album), 1995
  , 1995
  , 1996
  , 1998
   (Karaoke ver of All Image Album songs), 1998
  (Complete Album Collection of all Image Albums), 2002
Anime OST
 , 2002
 , 2004

References

External links
 Mizuna Kuwabara Official Website 
 Anime Series Official Website 
 
 

1990 Japanese novels
2002 anime television series debuts
2004 anime OVAs
Anime and manga based on light novels
Anime OVAs
Aniplex
Hakusensha manga
Japanese LGBT-related television shows
Light novels
Madhouse (company)
Media Blasters
Shinto in fiction
Shueisha books
Television shows based on light novels